This is a list of programmes currently, formerly, and upcoming on Nickelodeon in the United Kingdom and Ireland.

Current programming

Live-action

Animation

Reruns

Live-action

Animation

Former programming
 100 Deeds for Eddie McDowd (2004)
 The Adventures of Kid Danger (26 July 2021 – 30 July 2021)
 The Adventures of Pete & Pete (1994–1997)
 The Adventures of Portland Bill (1994–1999)
 Alien Surf Girls (2012–2013)
 Albert the Fifth Musketeer
 All That (2020-2021)
 Alvin and the Chipmunks (1994–1997)
 The Alvin Show (1995–1997)
 The Amanda Show (July 2001 – 2013)
 America's Most Musical Family (2019–January 2020)
 Animal Antics (1999–2000)
 The Animals of Farthing Wood (1996–1997)
 Animorphs (1998–2001)
 Are You Afraid of the Dark? (1994–1998; 2002–2003; 2008–2009)
 The Astronauts (2022)
 As Told by Ginger (2002-2005)
 Attack of the Killer Tomatoes (1994–1997)
 Bella and the Bulldogs (2015–2019; 2021)
 Bailey Kipper's P.O.V. (1995–1996)
 Bananas In Pajamas (1994-2000)
 Batfink (1994–1995)
 Bay City (1995–1996)
 Best Of Slimefest (2020-2021)
 Big Time Rush (2010-2015; 2020-2021)
 The Bin Weevils Show (2006-2007; 2012-2013)
 The Blobheads (2004–2006)
 Blossom (2004–2006)
 Bob the Builder
 Bod
 The Brothers Garcia (2001–04)
 Bubble and Squeak (2010)
 Budgie The Little Helicopter
 Bucket & Skinner's Epic Adventures (2011–2014)
 The Bureau of Magical Things (2018-2021)
 California Dreams (1999–2002)
 Camp Orange (2012)
 The Casagrandes (2020–2022)
 ChalkZone (2003-2011)
 Cardcaptors (2001)
 Clangers
 Clarissa Explains It All (1993–1997; 2010)
 Clueless
 The Complete Freaks of Nature
 Complete Savages (2005–2007)
 Cousins for Life
 Cousin Skeeter (1999–2002, 2010)
 Count Duckula (1994–1998)
 The Country Mouse and the City Mouse Adventures (1998–2002)
 Crime Time
 The Crystal Maze (US) (2020)
 Crystal Tipps and Alistair (1997–2000)
 Cubeez (2004)
 Dance Academy (2013)
 Danger Force: Shorts (2021)
 Danger Force: Super Charged (2020-2021)
 Danny Phantom (2004-2010)
 Darcy's Wild Life (2005–2007)
 Dawn Patrol
 Denver, the Last Dinosaur (1994–1997)
 Dig & Dug with Daisy (1993–2000)
 Dino Babies
 Dora the Explorer (2004–2011)
 Dorg Van Dango (August 2020-November 2020)
 Doug (1994–2010)
 Dr. Zitbag's Transylvania Pet Shop
 Dracula (1994–1995)
 Dragon Tales
 Drake and Josh (2004–2012; 2019; 2021)
 Drama Club (2021-2022)
 Driven Crazy
 Dungeons & Dragons
 El Tigre: The Adventures of Manny Rivera (2007–2009)
 The Elephant Show
 Engie Benjy
 Enid Blyton's Enchanted Lands (1998–1999)
 Eureeka's Castle (1994–1997)
 Every Witch Way (2014–2019)
 Extreme Ghostbusters (1998–2004)
 The Fairly OddParents (2002–2013; 2022)
 Find Me in Paris (2018-2023)
 Fraggle Rock (1993–2001)
 Fraggle Rock: The Animated Series (2003–2004)
 The Fresh Prince of Bel-Air (2011–2013)
 Galaxy High School (1994–1995)
 Garbage Pail Kids 
 Game Shakers (2015-2023) 
 Genie in the House
 George Of The Jungle (1994–1995)
 Get The Picture (1993–1994)
 Gilmore Girls (2003–2004)
 Girls In Love (2003–2005)
 Global Guts
 Go, Diego, Go!
 Goldie’s Oldies (2021-2022)
 Gormiti: The Lords of Nature Return!
 Gortimer Gibbon's Life on Normal Street
 Grizzly Tales for Gruesome Kids (2011–2012)
 Group Chat (2020-2021)
 Guinevere Jones
 Gullah Gullah Island (1995–2002)
 Guys Like Us
 Hairy Jeremy (1996–1999)
 The Haunted Hathaways (2013-2021)
 Help! I'm a Teenage Outlaw
 Henry's Cat (1994–1999)
 The Herbs (1995–2001)
 Hey Dude (1993–1994)
 House of Anubis (2011-2023)
 How to Rock
 The Hoobs (Originally Also on Channel 4)
 Hunter Street (2017-2023)
 Huxley Pig (1997–1999)
 I Am Frankie
 I Spy
 Insektors (1997–2000)
 Instant Mom
 Instant Star 
 Invader Zim (2002–2004)
 Ivor the Engine (1995–2001)
 James the Cat (1993–2001)
 Jim Henson's Animal Show (1995–1998)
 Jimbo and the Jet Set (1994–2000)
 Joe 90 (1994–1995)
 Joe (1995–2001)
 Jordan & Perri's Ultimate Block Party (2013)
 The Journey of Allen Strange
 Jumanji (1996–1998)
 Just Add Magic (2018-2023)
 Just Jordan (2007–2008)
 KaBlam! (1996–2000)
 Kappa Mikey (2006–2008)
 Katie and Orbie (1993–1997)
 Kenan & Kel (1997–2012)
 King (2003–2006)
 King Arthur's Disasters (2005–2007)
 King Rollo (1995–2001)
 Kipper
 Kissyfur (1995–1996)
 Kitu and Woofl (1997–1999) 
 Knight Squad (2018-2021) 
 Kung Fu Panda Legends of Awesomeness (2011–2015)
 Land of the Lost (1991 series) (1994–1995)
 Laugh Out Loud
 The Legend of Korra (2013–2015; 12 August 2020)
 Legends of the Hidden Temple (1993–1994)
 Life With Boys (2011–2014)
 Little Bear (1997–2002)
 Little Bill (2000-2004)
 Littlest Pet Shop (1995–1996)
 Lizzie's Library (1997–2000)
 Middlemost Post - Shorts (7 September 2021 – 23 September 2021) (Originally also airing on Nicktoons)
 Magic Adventures of Mumfie (1997–2002)
 Max and Shred
 Max Glick (1994)
 The Magic House (1996–2002)
 Magic Mountain (1998–2000)
 The Magic School Bus (1995–2000)
 Maisy
 Make It Pop 
 Mako Mermaids
 Marvin Marvin (2013–2014)
 Mary-Kate and Ashley in Action
 Mia and Me (2014)
 The Mighty B! (2008–14 February 2010)
 Mighty Max (1994–1997)
 Mission Top Secret (1994-1995)
 Moesha (1996–2001)
 Mona the Vampire (1999–2006) (Originally also on CBBC)
 The Monkees (1994)
 Monsters vs Aliens (2013–2015)
 Monty the Dog (1996–1999)
 Moschops (1996–2001)
 Grimmy (1994–1997)
 Mouse and Mole (1996–1999)
 Massive Monster Mayhem
 Mr. Bean: The Animated Series
 Mr. Bean: The Live-Action Series (2006–2009)
 Mr Benn (1995–2001)
 Mr. Magoo (1993)
 Mr. Men and Little Miss (1994–2000)
 Muppet Babies (1997–2000)
 The Muppet Show (1994–1997)
 My Brother and Me (1998)
 My Dad the Rock Star (2004)
 My Life as a Teenage Robot (2005)
 My Parents are Aliens (2005–2010)
 Mighty Morphin' Power Rangers (2011–2014)
 The Naked Brothers Band (2007–2013)
 Nancy Drew and the Hardy Boys (1995–1996)
 Naturally, Sadie
 Ned's Declassified School Survival Guide
 The New Adventures of Speed Racer (1994–1995)
 Ni Hao Kai Lan (2007–2011)
 Nickelodeon Guts (1993–1996)
 Nick Kicks (2016–2017)
 Nickelodeon UK Kids' Choice Awards (2007–2013)
 Nicky, Ricky, Dicky & Dawn (2014–2021; 2023)
 Noah Knows Best (November 2000 – 2002)
 Noah's Ark (1998–2000)
 Noah's Island (1998–2002)
 Noddy (1996–1999)
 Oakie Doke (1996–1999)
 The Odyssey
 Oh Yeah! Cartoons (1999–2003)
 Old Bear and Friends (1997-2001)
 Olive the Ostrich (2011)
 Open Sesame (1997-2002)
 Oscar and Friends
 Oscar's Orchestra (1997–2000)
 Out of Control
 Pablo the Little Red Fox (1999)
 Paddington Bear (1995–2001)
 Papa Beaver's Storytime (1997–2000)
 Parsley the Lion (1997–1999)
 PB Bear and Friends (1998–2001)
 Pee-Wee's Playhouse (1993–1996)
 Pelswick (2001–2002)
 The Penguins of Madagascar (2009–2012)
 Peppa Pig (2010–2011)
 Pet Alien (2007–2011)
 Philbert Frog (1993–1995)
 Pic Me
 Pirate Islands
 Planet Sheen (2011–2012)
 Plasmo (1997–1999)
 Playbox (1996–2000)
 Playbus (1996–1999)
 Playdays (1996–1999)
 The Pondles (1993–1995)
 PopPixie (2014)
 Poppy Cat (2011)
 Postman Pat (1996–1999)
 Power Rangers Megaforce (2013–2017)
 Power Rangers Samurai (2011–2016)
 Press Gang (1997)
 Rabbids Invasion (2014)
 Rabbit Ears
 Radio Free Roscoe (2004-2005)
 Rainbow (1994 series) (1999–2002)
 Raising Dad
 The Real Macaw
 Redwall (2000)
 Regal Academy
 The Ren & Stimpy Show (2 May 1994–2000) (since 25 August 2022, now airing on Comedy Central)
 Renford Rejects (1998–2020)
 Ricky Sprocket: Showbiz Boy (29 September 2007 - November 2008)
 Roary the Racing Car (23 November 2007 - 25 March 2011)
 Rocket Power (21 May 2000–2003; 2004 - 2005)
 Rocko's Modern Life (1994–2001, November 2004 - 2005)
 Romeo! (November 2003 - 2008)
 Roobarb (1993)
 Rotten Ralph (2000–2004)
 Round the Twist (1996–1999)
 Roundhouse (1994–1995)
 Rubbadubbers
 Rude Dog & The Dweebs (1995–1997)
 Rugrats (original series) (1994–2013; 2020) (also airing on NickToons)
 Sabrina, the Teenage Witch (1996–January 2006) 
 Salute Your Shorts (1993–1994)
 Sanjay and Craig (2013–2014)
 Santo Bugito (1995–1996)
 Sam & Cat (2013-2023)
 Saved by the Bell (Original series) (September 2000–February 2008)
 Saved by the Bell: The College Years 
 School of Rock (2016-2021) 
 The Secret World of Alex Mack (1995–1999, 2002)
 See Dad Run (2014–2019)
 Sheeep
 Ship to Shore (1994–1996)
 The Shoe People (1995–1999)
 Sister, Sister (1995–2009)
 The Sleepover Club (May 2004 - December 2008)
 Slimer! and the Real Ghostbusters
 The Smoggies (1994–1996) 
 Space Cases
 Space Goofs (2006–28 March 2010)
 Speed Racer (1994–1995)
 Spider (1996–1999)
 Spider-Man: The New Animated Series (24 April 2004 - 2005)
 Stickin' Around (1996–1998) 
 The Substitute (2020-2022) 
 Supah Ninjas (2011–2014)
 SuperTed (1993–1994)
 Summer in Transylvania (October 2010–2020)
 Takeshi's Castle Thailand (2018)
 Teleshopping (2018-1 January 2019)
 Taina (October 2001–February 2003, January 2006)
 Tak And The Power Of Juju (2008–2010)
 Takeshi's Castle Thailand (2018-2021)
 Tales from the Cryptkeeper (1997–1999)
 Tales of the Tooth Fairies (1994–1999)
 Team Umizoomi (2010)
 Teenage Mutant Ninja Turtles (1993–1997)
 Teenage Mutant Ninja Turtles (2012–2015)
 Teletubbies (Original series) (1997–2000)
 Thomas the Tank Engine and Friends (1999–2002) 
 The Legend of Korra (2013-2015; 2020)
 The Treacle People (2000-2002)
 The Three Friends and Jerry (1999–2009)
  The Tiny Chef Show  (13 January 2023)
 Tom Slick (1994)
 Toucan Tecs (1994–1995)
 A Town Called Panic (2005–2006)
 Towser (1994 - 1998)
 The Trap Door
 The Troop (March 2010–2014; 2018 - 2020)
 True Jackson, VP (2009–2014; 2021)
 Trumpton (1997–2000)
 Tube Mice (1994–1995)
 Tucker (2001–2004)
 T.U.F.F. Puppy (2011–2014)
 Two of a Kind (1998–2000)
 Nickelodeon Un-edited (8 September 2021 – 22 September 2021)
 Ultraman (1994–1995)
 Unfabulous (April 2005 – 18 April 2010)
 Unfiltered (2020-2021)
 Unleashed (2021)
 USA High
 Victor & Maria (1997–1998)
 Visionaries: Knights of the Magical Light
 Warped! (2022)
 Wayside (27 June 2008 - 13 February 2009)
 Weinerville (1993–1994)
 Welcome Freshmen (1993)
 What I Like About You
 Where on Earth Is Carmen Sandiego? (1994–1997)
 Wiggly Park (1998–2001)
 Wil Cwac Cwac (1993–2000)
 The Wild Side Show
 William's Wish Wellingtons (1996–1999)
 Willo the Wisp (1995–1999)
 Winx Club (2011–2021)
 Wimzie's House (1997–2000)
 Wisdom of the Gnomes (1993–1995)
 Wishbone (1996–1998)
 WITS Academy
 The Wombles (1995–2001)
 The Wonder Pets! (September 2009–2010)
 The Wild Thornberrys (17 November 1998 – 2004 - 2005; 3–31 August 2020)
 The World of David the Gnome (1993–1996)
 The World of Tosh (2004 - November 2006)
 The Worst Witch (2003–2005)
 Wow! Wow! Wubbzy! (13 August 2007–December 2008)
 The Wubbulous World of Dr. Seuss (1997–2000) 
 The X's (2006 - 12 December 2010)
 Yakkity Yak (2004–2005)
 You Do Too (2003 - 2007)
 You Gotta See This (12 January 2013–17 August 2014)
 Yu-Gi-Oh! (June 2002–2005)
 Zoey 101 (June 2005-October 2008 - December 2009;2011 - 2012; 2022)

Programming blocks

Current blocks
 Thank Nick It’s Friday (August 2001 – August 2002; 11 September 2020 – present)
 Toons On Toast (6 June 2022 – present; Originally On Nicktoons)
 After School Club (5 September 2022 – Present)

Former blocks
 Nick Jr. (1993 – July 2000)
 CBBC on Nickelodeon (1996 – 1999)
 Nick at Nite (27 June 2016 – 2019)

See also
 Nick Jr. 
 Nick Jr Too
 Nicktoons
 Channel 5
 Milkshake

References

Nickelodeon
Nickelodeon UK
Nickelodeon-related lists